Indian filter coffee is a coffee drink made by mixing hot milk and sugar with the infusion obtained by percolation brewing of finely ground coffee powder with chicory in a traditional Indian filter. It has been described as "hot, strong, sweet and topped with bubbly froth" and is known as filter kaapi in India.

History
Popular Indian lore says that on a pilgrimage to Mecca in the 16th century Baba Budan, a revered Sufi saint from Karnataka state, discovered the wonders of coffee. Eager to grow coffee at home, he smuggled seven coffee beans from the Yemeni port of Mocha in his garments. Returning home, he planted the beans on the slopes of the Chandragiri Hills in Chickmagaluru district, Mysore State (present-day Karnataka). This hill range was later named after him as the Baba Budan Hills. His tomb is near Chikmagalur.

Ingredients

Traditionally, Indian filter coffee is made with Plantation A washed arabica or Peaberry coffee beans. The beans are dark roasted, ground, and blended with chicory, with the coffee constituting 80-90% and the chicory 10-20% of the mixture. The chicory's slight bitterness contributes to the flavor of Indian filter coffee.

Traditionally, jaggery or honey were used as sweeteners, but white sugar has been used since the mid-1900s.

Preparation

South Indian filter coffee is brewed with a metal device that resembles two cylindrical cups, one of which has a pierced bottom that nests into the top of the 'tumbler' cup, leaving ample room beneath to receive the brewed coffee. The upper cup has two removable parts: a pierced pressing disc with a central stem handle and a covering lid. (A similar device is used to brew Vietnamese coffee.)

The upper cup is loaded with freshly ground coffee. The grounds are then compressed (tamped) with the stemmed disc into a uniform layer across the cup's pierced bottom. The coarser the coffee grinds, the more one must tamp the coffee to obtain the same extraction. With the press disc remaining in place, the upper cup is nested into the top of the tumbler; boiling water is poured in. The lid is placed on top, and the appliance is left to slowly drip the brewed coffee into the bottom. The chicory retains the hot water longer, letting the water dissolve and extract more of the ground coffee.

The resulting brew is generally much stronger than Western drip/filter coffee, and often stronger than espresso.

Traditionally, the coffee is consumed by adding 1–2 tablespoons of the brew to a cup of boiling milk with the preferred amount of sugar. The coffee is drunk from the tumbler (although a word of English origin, it seems to be the most commonly used name for this vessel), but is often cooled first with a dabarah (also pronounced in some regions as 'davarah'), a wide metal saucer with lipped walls.

Coffee is typically served after pouring back and forth between the dabara and the tumbler in huge arc-like motions of the hand. This serves several purposes: mixing the ingredients (including sugar) thoroughly; cooling the hot coffee to a sipping temperature; and most importantly, aerating the mix without introducing extra water (such as with a steam wand used for frothing cappuccinos). An anecdote related to the distance between the pouring and receiving cup leads to another name for the drink,  "Meter Coffee".

Culture

Coffee is now popular in the southern states of India, including Tamil Nadu, Kerala, Karnataka, and Andhra Pradesh. During the 19th century, South Indians started adopting milk and a sweetener into their coffee.

Name
 A traditional Kannada name for coffee is "Boondh Bisneeru". The term was popular about two generations ago, and has since lost favour in popular usage.
Filter coffee is knows as kaapi in South India and is an important part of the culture there.
 A term often heard for high-quality coffee is Degree Coffee. Milk certified as pure with a lactometer was called degree milk owing to a mistaken association with the thermometer. It is claimed that coffee prepared with degree milk became known as degree coffee. Yet another possible derivation for the term is from the chicory used to make the coffee. The South Indian pronunciation of chickory became chigory, then digory, and finally degree. Another explanation is that when coffee is infused for the first time, it is referred to as the first degree or simply as the "Degree Coffee". This has the strongest flavour and the necessary strength to mix with milk without watering down the taste.

See also
 Turkish coffee
 List of coffee beverages
 List of Indian drinks

References

External links
 Official website of The Coffee Board of India
 Official website of Indian Coffee House (Note: This is not the original coffee house that was set up by the British in Madras.)

Filter coffee
Karnataka cuisine
Tamil cuisine
Coffee drinks
Coffee in India